Nouveau Riche was a Philadelphia based music group led by Dice Raw.

An EP was released in 2008, called the Nouveau Riche Longtail EP, downloadable for free on the group's official Myspace page, and has managed to obtain considerable success all over the Internet.

The band was also nominated for the 2007 Okayplayer Music Awards in the Rookie of the Year Category but lost to Gym Class Heroes.

After releasing a second EP for free through their Myspace page in 2008 which was titled Free Money EP, the band announced that they'd break up and that "Nouveau Riche is no more".

Discography

EP's
Nouveau Riche Longtail EP
Free Money EP

Related artists
Lupe Fiasco
The Roots

References

Musical groups from Philadelphia
Musical groups established in 2005
Musical groups disestablished in 2008